= UCSY railway station =

Railway station in Yangon, Myanmar

Coordinates: 17°00′08″N 96°05′27″E

UCSY railway station (University of Computer Studies station) is a railway station in Yangon, Burma.
